Gordon Paul Scruton (born March 8, 1947) was the Bishop of Western Massachusetts from 1996 till 2012.

Early life, education and career
Scruton was born in 1947 in Rochester, New Hampshire. According to his official biography he received a master's degree in English, magna cum laude, from Barrington College, then studied at the Boston University School of Theology, receiving a master's degree in theology in 1971. Scruton married Rebecca S. Polley in 1968.  He was ordained a deacon in 1971, a priest in 1972, and served as an assistant rector at St. Mark's Church in Riverside, Rhode Island and at St. Paul's Church in Kingston, Rhode Island in the mid-1970s.  Scruton was rector of Grace Church in Dalton, Massachusetts from 1977 to 1981, and St. Francis Church in Holden, Massachusetts thereafter.

Bishop of Western Massachusetts

Scruton was elected the eighth Bishop of the Episcopal Diocese of Western Massachusetts on June 29, 1996.  He was consecrated bishop on October 12, 1996, in Springfield, Massachusetts.  He was consecrated by the following current or retired bishops: Alexander Doig Stewart (American bishop)|Alexander Stewart]], Andrew Wissemann, M. Thomas Shaw, Barbara Clementine Harris, and Emmanuel Kolini (Bishop of the Diocese of Shaba in Zaire).  Presiding Bishop Edmond Lee Browning was also a consecrator.

Likewise, Scruton was a co-consecrator of George Edward Councell as eleventh bishop of New Jersey.

He has been very active in the House of Bishops since 2001.  Scruton has been on the court for the trial of a bishop.  He has acted as a mediator in the dispute between the Bishop of Connecticut and some priests in that state in 2007.  In 2009, he also served on a committee to assist the Diocese of Southern Virginia in their internal conflicts. He retired on December 1, 2012.

References

See also

 List of bishops of the Episcopal Church in the United States of America
 Episcopal Diocese of Western Massachusetts

1947 births
Boston University School of Theology alumni
Living people
American Anglo-Catholics
People from Rochester, New Hampshire
Anglo-Catholic bishops
People from Holden, Massachusetts
Barrington College alumni
Episcopal bishops of Western Massachusetts